is a town located in Akita Prefecture, Japan. , the town had an estimated population of 14,011 in 5220 households, and a population density of 61 persons per km². .

Geography

Neighboring municipalities
Akita Prefecture
Yuzawa
Yokote
Yurihonjō

Areas
Ugo is divided into seven distinct areas:

 is the cultural and economic hub of the town and is home to most of the residents. Nishimonai is also home to the majority of restaurants, shops, drinking establishments, and some small parks. Every August the town's most famous festival the Bon Odori is held on the streets of Nishimonai.
 is the second-largest district in Ugo and is home to one or two small soba shops. It also houses Miwa Suga Jinjya, the oldest and most important shrine in town. 
 Mostly a residential area, although there are some shops, and some sights to see.
 is, much like all of Ugo, heavy with farms. However, it is also the home of Arcadia park as well as the only onsen in Ugo.

Demographics
Per Japanese census data, the population of Ugo has been in steady decline for the past 70 years.

Climate
Ugo has a Humid continental climate (Köppen climate classification Dfa) with large seasonal temperature differences, with warm to hot (and often humid) summers and cold (sometimes severely cold) winters. Precipitation is significant throughout the year, but is heaviest from August to October. Ugo is noted for its heavy snows with accumulated snows exceeding two meters in most winters.  The average annual temperature in Ugo is 9.4 °C. The average annual rainfall is 1800 mm with September as the wettest month. The temperatures are highest on average in August, at around 23.5 °C, and lowest in January, at around -3.1 °C.

History
The area of present-day Ugo was part of ancient Ugo Province, dominated by the Satake clan during the Edo period, who ruled Kubota Domain under the Tokugawa shogunate. The village of Nishimonai was established within Ogachi District with the establishment of the modern municipalities system on April 1, 1889. It was raised to town status on July 6, 1897. The town of Ugo was established on April 1, 1955 by the merger of the town of Nishimonai with the surrounding villages of Miwa, Niinari, Meiji Motonishimonai, Tashiro, and Sendo, all from Ogachi District.

Economy
The economy of Ugo is based on agriculture, primarily rice cultivation.

Ugo is location of the OTC (Orient Technical Center). It is a factory of luxury watches. OTC owned by Orient Watch Co., Ltd.

Education
Ugo has four public elementary schools and one public middle school operated by the town government, and one public high school operated by the Akita Prefectural Board of Education.

Elementary Schools

Junior High Schools

High Schools

Transportation

Railway
Ugo does not have any railway services.

Highway

Places of worship
: Oldest and most important Shinto shrine in Ugo. The main building of this shrine was built in the Muromachi era with several others having been added over the following 400 years. Like most shrines in Ugo this shrine is surrounded by many cedar trees.
: A 15-minute car ride and a 25-minute hike over a well worn mountain trail with many wooden stairs will bring you to the shrine at the top of Ugo's tiny Mt. Taihei. The shrine provides a sweeping view of southern Akita from Yuzawa all the way to Daisen. Especially recommended in fall.
: Located next to the Nishimonai post office, this is Nishimonai's main shrine. It is located in the center of a stand of tall cedars.

Local attractions 
: A windy mountain path that leads over the branch of the Dewa mountains that cuts across the western third of Ugo. It leads from Motonishi into Tashiro, and is a popular challenge for cyclists. There are areas to stop and take in the natural environment as well as the local spring water known for extending life – .
: The oldest house in Akita prefecture. The main part of the house was built in the first half of the 17th century and the gate house being finished by 1733.
: A park complex Located in Nishimonai and Niinari. There is a small golf course with driving range (which doubles as a ski slope in the winter), picnic areas, a pond, and the Toshitoland spa and restaurant building.

Local festivals and events 
Ugo is well known in Akita for the annual Bon Dance in Nishimonai.

Nishimonai Bon Odori 
The  is held every year from August 16–18. It is a symbolic dance to show proper respect and gratefulness to one's deceased ancestors. It is ranked as one of the top 3 bon dances in Japan. It began as a harvest dance in Nishimonai in about 1280. In 1601 the lord of Nishimonai, Onodera Shigemichi, burned his castle after a defeat and the people danced among the ruins to remember their lord. These two dances were merged in the late 18th century to form the dance's last incarnation which (despite attempts to stop it in the early 20th century) continues to this day. It is the biggest festival of the year, drawing people from all over Tohoku, and the country at large.

The week before the festival all of the shops on the Bon Odori street open up and display traditional  patchwork kimono,  hats and  masks.

The shops and food stands open at around 5. The dance begins as the sun goes down and continues until about 11.

Yukitopia
The annual  takes place on the last Saturday and Sunday of January. A horse-drawn carriage follows set course through Nishimonai, Motonishi, and all the way up the Nana Magari mountain road, crossing into Tashiro. The road is lined with small lanterns made from snow.

Noted people from Ugo
Satō Nobuhiro, Meiji period political theorist

Notes

External links

Official Website 

 
Towns in Akita Prefecture